José Aguilar Martinez (born 5 February 2001) is a Spanish professional footballer who plays as a midfielder for the Swiss club FC Sion.

Professional career
Aguilar moved to Switzerland at the age of 15, and shortly after joined the youth academy of Sion. Aguilar made his professional debut with Sion. He worked his way up their youth categories, in 2018 having reached the U18s and then their U21s. He made his senior debut in a 1–0 Swiss Super League loss to Thun on 25 May 2019.

References

External links
 
 SFL Profile
 Bild Profile

2001 births
Footballers from Almería
Living people
Spanish footballers
Association football midfielders
FC Sion players
Swiss Super League players
Swiss Promotion League players
Spanish expatriate footballers
Expatriate footballers in Switzerland
Spanish expatriate sportspeople in Switzerland